Theatre Calgary, is a theatre company in Calgary, Alberta, Canada, established as a professional company in 1968. It was preceded by Workshop 14, a theatre study group founded in 1944 by Betty Mitchell.   Calgary's Betty Mitchell awards are named after her.

Artistic Directors
Christopher Newton (1968–1971)
Clarke Rogers (1971–1972)
Harold G. Baldridge (1972–1978)
Rick McNair (1978–1984)
Sharon Pollock (1984–1985)
Martin Kinch (1985–1991)
Brian Rintoul (1991–1996)
James Brewer, Acting Artistic Director (1996–1997)
Ian Prinsloo (1997–2005)
Dennis Garnhum (2005–2016)
Shari Wattling, Interim Artistic Director (2016–2017)
Stafford Arima (2017–present)

2017–2018 season 
Blow Wind High Water - by Sharon Pollock
Sisters: The Belles Soeurs Musical - based on the play by Michel Tremblay, book and lyrics by René Richard Cyr, music by Daniel Belanger
Twelfth Night - by William Shakespeare
The Humans - by Stephen Karam
The Secret Garden - book and lyrics by Marsha Norman, music by Lucy Simon
As You Like It - by William Shakespeare
A Christmas Carol - by Charles Dickens, shown from 20-22 november 2020adapted by Dennis Garnhum
Onegin - by Amiel Gladstone and Veda Hille

References

External links
Official Site

Theatre companies in Alberta
Theatre in Calgary